Adriana Sklenaříková (formerly Karembeu; born 17 September 1971) is a Slovak fashion model and actress. She is a former Guinness record holder for the longest legs among female models (at almost 1.24 m).

Early life
Sklenaříková was born in Brezno, a town in central Slovakia. While studying medicine in Prague, Sklenaříková entered and won a modelling contest.

Career

In 1998, she was hired as one of the models for the Wonderbra campaign.

In the United States, she modeled for Victoria's Secret.

In 2005 she featured in the Channel 5 TV documentary Bra Wars: Boom or Bust

In 2007 she was the host of Top Model on Métropole 6.

In 2008 she participated in Rendez-vous en terre inconnue on France 2.

In 2011 she was a contestant in the first season of the French Dancing with the Stars.

Filmography

Others 
She was one of the contestants during the first season of Danse avec les stars. With her partner Julien Brugel, she reached the semi-final and finished in the 4th position.
This table shows the route of Adriana Karembeu and Julien Brugel in Danse Avec Les Stars.

Personal life

Sklenarikova was labeled as the Tall version or the hidden twin sister of actress Pamela Anderson, who is half-foot shorter, for her resemblance to the actress.

She met French football player Christian Karembeu on a flight from Paris to Milan in 1998, and they were married in December that year. On 9 March 2011, in an interview to French magazine Paris Match, Adriana revealed that she was separating from her husband. She stated that the causes for the separation were the couple's constant exposure in the media and their "hectic lifestyle" as well as him being "upset to see photographs of [her] with other men appearing in the press and speculation that [she] had a lover". Christian refused questions from the media about the divorce, stating that he would not comment in public about his private life.

In June 2014, she married Armenian businessman Aram Ohanian, her boyfriend of three years. Their wedding was held in Monaco, and was attended by numerous film and show business stars; in August 2018 Adriana became the mother of a daughter named Nina. In December 2022 Adriana announced her second divorce from Ohanian.

Award
2009 Vienna Fashion Award, category Style Icon

References

External links

Adriana Sklenarikova – AskMen.com
Adriana Karembeu – likeat.me

1971 births
Living people
People from Brezno
Slovak expatriates in France
Slovak female models
Slovak actresses
Association footballers' wives and girlfriends